"Your Personal Touch" is a song recorded by American R&B singer Evelyn "Champagne" King. The song, written by Allen George and Fred McFarlane, was released in 1985 by RCA Victor.

The song is also included in her 1985 album A Long Time Coming.

Although "Your Personal Touch" did not top the charts, it proved a moderate success for King. "Your Personal Touch" reached the top ten of the Billboard R&B and Dance charts, peaking at #9 and #5, respectively. It also reached #86 on the Hot 100 and #37 on the UK Singles Chart.

Track listing

1985 releases
12-inch vinyl
 US: RCA Victor / PW-14202

7-inch vinyl
 UK: RCA Records / PB 49915

Personnel 
 Performer: Evelyn King
 Producer: Allen George
 Producer: Fred McFarlane
 Producer: Jimmy Douglass
 Arranged, mixed by Allen George and Fred McFarlane for Terrible Two Productions

Chart performance

References

1985 singles
Evelyn "Champagne" King songs
RCA Victor singles
1985 songs
Songs written by Fred McFarlane